Palaeomolgophis is an extinct genus of eel-like prehistoric amphibian containing a single species—Palaeomolgophis scoticus. Their limbs are much reduced, and they were probably were fully aquatic.

See also

 Prehistoric amphibian
 List of prehistoric amphibians

References

External links 
 2D, stereoscopic, and 3D imagery of the type specimen of Palaeomolgophis scoticus

Adelospondyls
Fossil taxa described in 1967
Carboniferous amphibians of Europe